Luigi Pareysón (4 February 1918 – 8 September 1991) was an Italian philosopher, best known for challenging the positivist and idealist aesthetics of Benedetto Croce in his 1954 monograph, Estetica. Teoria della formatività (Aesthetics. A Theory of Formativity), which builds on the hermeneutics of the Austrian philosopher Ludwig Wittgenstein.

Biography
Luigi Pareyson was born on 4 February 1918, in Piasco, in the province of Cuneo. He received his doctorate from the University of Turin in 1939, finishing his degree with a dissertation entitled "Karl Jaspers and the Philosophy of Existence."  As a professor at the University of Turin, he had many famous students, including Mario Perniola, Gianni Vattimo, Umberto Eco, and Valerio Verra who studied with Gadamer in Germany and diffused his thought in Italy.

In 1971 Pareyson published Verità ed interpretazione (Truth and interpretation), his fundamental text which two years later was followed by Verra's monography Ontologia e ermeneutica in Germania (Ontology and hermeneutics in Germany). Preceded by the Italian jurist Emilio Betti, the work of Pareyson spread hermeneutics out of the juridical studies in which it had been limited until then. Pareyson gave birth to the Italian hermeneutic school of thought, a school that dominated the Italian philosophical gamut until the 1990s. His thought intersected the approvato of Gianni Vattino and Sergio Givone, followed by Carlo Sini, Vincenzo Vitiello, Carlo Bianco and Mario Ruggenini.

Pareyson died in Milan on 8 September 1991.

Bibliography
La filosofia dell'esistenza e Karl Jaspers, Napoli: Loffredo, 1940 (new ed. Karl Jaspers, Casale M.: Marietti, 1983)
Studi sull'esistenzialismo, Firenze: Sansoni, 1943
Esistenza e persona, Torino: Taylor, 1950 (IV ed. Genova: Il Melangolo, 1985)
L'estetica dell'idealismo tedesco, Torino: Edizioni di «Filosofia», 1950
Fichte, Torino: Edizioni di «Filosofia», 1950 (new ed. Fichte. Il sistema della libertà, Milano: Mursia, 1976)
Estetica. Teoria della formatività, Torino: Edizioni di «Filosofia», 1954 (new ed. Milano: Bompiani 1988)
Teoria dell'arte, Milano: Marzorati, 1965
I problemi dell'estetica, Milano: Marzorati, 1966
Conversazioni di estetica, Milano: Mursia, 1966
Il pensiero etico di Dostoevskij, Torino: Einaudi, 1967
Verità e interpretazione, Milano: Mursia, 1971
L'esperienza artistica, Milano: Marzorati, 1974
Federico Guglielmo Schelling, in Grande antologia filosofica, vol. XVIII, Milano: Marzorati, 1971, pp. 1–340
Dostoevskij: filosofia, romanzo ed esperienza religiosa, 1976; Torino: Einaudi, 1993
La filosofia e il problema del male, "Annuario filosofico" 2 (1986), pp. 7–69
Filosofia dell'interpretazione, Torino: Rosenberg & Sellier, 1988
Filosofia della libertà, Genova: Il Melangolo, 1989
Ontologia della libertà. Il male e la sofferenza, Torino: Einaudi, 1995 (posthumous).
Existence, Interpretation, Freedom: Selected Writings, Aurora (CO): Davies Group, 2009 (selected writings edited with an introduction and notes by Paolo Diego Bubbio).

References

External links 
 Luigi Pareyson (in Italian)

1918 births
1991 deaths
20th-century Italian philosophers
Italian semioticians
People from the Province of Cuneo
University of Turin alumni
Philosophers of art
Ontologists